Mercy is a feminine given name or nickname which may refer to:

 Mercy Abang, Nigerian journalist
 Mercy Aigbe Gentry (born 1979), Nigerian actress, director and businesswoman
 Mercy Akide (born 1975), Nigerian former footballer
 Mercy Chinwo (born 1990), Nigerian gospel musician, singer and songwriter
 Mercy Johnson (born 1984), Nigerian actress
 Mercy Joseph (born 1992), Kenyan badminton player
 Mercy Kuttan (born 1960), Indian former track and field athlete
 Mercy Lewis (c. 1675/75-17??), an accuser in the Salem Witch Trials
 Mercy Oduyoye (born 1934), Ghanaian Methodist theologian
 Mercy Ravi (1945-2009), Indian politician, social worker and writer
 Mercy Dee Walton (1915–1962), American jump blues pianist, singer and songwriter
 Mercy Wanjiku (born 1986), Kenyan long-distance runner who specialises in the steeplechase
 Mercy Otis Warren (1727-1814), political writer and propagandist of the American Revolution
 Chifundo "Mercy" James, daughter of pop star Madonna

Feminine given names
Virtue names